Dacula High School is a high school in Dacula, Georgia, United States, serving students in grades 9–12. It is operated by Gwinnett County Public Schools. It is a part of the Dacula cluster and is fed from Dacula Middle School.

The school's colors are old gold, white, and navy blue, and its mascot is the Falcon.

Notable alumni
 Alex Armah, NFL player
 David Irons, former NFL player
 Kenny Irons, former NFL player
 Corey Levin, NFL player

References

External links
 Dacula High School
 About the Dacula Band Staff

Public high schools in Georgia (U.S. state)
Educational institutions established in 1905
Schools in Gwinnett County, Georgia
1905 establishments in Georgia (U.S. state)